Peter Tunks (born 30 August 1958) is an Australian former professional rugby league footballer who played in the 1970s, 1980s and 1990s, and coached in the 1990s. He played for the South Sydney Rabbitohs, Canterbury-Bankstown Bulldogs, Penrith Panthers, New South Wales, and the Australian national side. After that he played with a number of clubs in England.

Tunks finished in the top eight at the Rothmans Medal six times in his career, and was also voted the best  in world rugby league twice in the 1980s.

Background
Tunks is a product of Marcellin College Randwick. Regarded as one of the best rugby league players to come out of this school, Tunks also represented NSW at rugby union as a schoolboy in 1976.

Playing career
Graded with Souths in 1977, Tunks made his debut that year as a front row forward at eighteen years of age. Tunks narrowly missed selection for the 1978 Kangaroo tour when he was voted one of the top rookies of the year. In the off season Tunks contracted glandular fever, hepatitis and a kidney disease and missed part of the 1979 season.

Tunks made his State of Origin début in 1981, the same year he led South Sydney to victory in the Panasonic Cup, scoring the winning try. In 1982 Tunks was told he would be touring with the Kangaroos but was not taken due to off field indiscretions.

In 1984 Tunks left Souths and went to Canterbury-Bankstown where Warren Ryan built a team around Tunks and Peter Kelly as prop forwards to create a style of play known as "Wozzaball", with the team nicknamed "The Enforcers" due to the power of their defence, which at the end of the 1984 season conceded just a solitary penalty goal in almost four complete games. With both Souths and Canterbury, Tunks would frequently run wide of the ruck, so that his try tally was unusually large for a front row forward.

Tunks played in four grand finals in five seasons for the Bulldogs, winning three. He toured New Zealand in 1985 with the Kangaroos and was voted player of the tour ahead of Wally Lewis, Mal Meninga, Peter Sterling and others. In 1986, Tunks refused to tour with the Kangaroos and he also refused to make himself available for the 1988 World Cup Final against New Zealand the week after he captained Canterbury to the premiership.

Tunks played ten State of Origin games but was selected in sixteen – missing some games due to injury. Tunks played Origin in 1985 when NSW won it for the first time and then played all 3 games in 1986 when NSW won the series 3–nil for the first time in Origin history.

Tunks played left-, i.e. number 8, in Leeds' 14–15 defeat by St. Helens in the 1987–88 John Player Special Trophy Final during the 1987–88 season at Central Park, Wigan on Saturday 9 January 1988.

In 1990, Tunks followed Phil Gould to Penrith but caught glandular fever and retired halfway through the season. He went to England where he had a successful coaching stint for three seasons with Oldham was then appointed Chief Executive at Wakefield Trinity and then Managing Director at Hull FC.

Club list 
 Australia 1985-87:10 games including 6 Tests (0pts)
 New South Wales 1981-87:10 games 1 try (3pts)
 South Sydney 1977-83: 98 games - 31t (86pts)
 Canterbury 1984-89: 125 games - 17t (56pts)
 Penrith 1990: 12 games (0pts)
 Leeds RLFC 1987-88: 24 games 7 tries
 Salford RLFC 1990-91: 14 games 4 tries
 Sheffield Eagles RLFC 1991: 16 games 4 tries

References

Sources
Encyclopedia of Rugby League Players, Canterbury-Bankstown edition by Alan Whiticker & Glen Hudson

External links 
Canterbury Bulldogs profile
 Peter Tunks at stateoforigin.com.au
(archived by web.archive.org) Peter Tunks at eraofthebiff.com

1958 births
Living people
Australia national rugby league team players
Australian rugby league coaches
Australian rugby league administrators
Australian rugby league players
Canterbury-Bankstown Bulldogs captains
Canterbury-Bankstown Bulldogs players
City New South Wales rugby league team players
Leeds Rhinos players
New South Wales City Origin rugby league team players
New South Wales Rugby League State of Origin players
Oldham R.L.F.C. coaches
Penrith Panthers players
Rugby league props
Rugby league second-rows
Rugby league locks
Rugby league players from Sydney
Sheffield Eagles (1984) players
South Sydney Rabbitohs players